Jameh mosque of Fahraj or Congregation mosque of Fahraj, Friday mosque of Fahraj or Grand mosque of Fahraj, Imam Hassan mosque is a mosque from early Islamic era located in Fahraj, Yazd Province, Iran.

The congregational mosque of Fahraj is located at the center of the present town. It is among the oldest extant mosques in Persia; it demonstrates the simple architectural characteristics of the early Islamic centuries.

Gallery

References 

8th-century mosques
Mosques in Iran
National works of Iran
Fahraj